The 1910 Marquette Blue and Gold football team was an American football team that represented Marquette University as an independent during the 1910 college football season. LEd by third-year head coach William Juneau, Marquette compiled a 6–1–2 record and outscored its opponents 267 to 11. Marquette's sole loss was a 3–2 decision against Michigan Agricultural, which finished the season 6–1.

Schedule

References

Marquette
Marquette Golden Avalanche football seasons
Marquette Blue and Gold football